Maintenance of Social Security Rights Convention, 1982 is  an International Labour Organization Convention.

It was established in 1982, with the preamble stating:
Having decided upon the adoption of certain proposals with regard to maintenance of migrant workers' rights in social security (revision of Convention No. 48),...

Ratifications 
As of 2013, the convention has been ratified by four states.

External links 
Text.
Ratifications.

Migrant workers
International Labour Organization conventions
Social security
Treaties concluded in 1982
Treaties entered into force in 1986
Treaties of Kyrgyzstan
Treaties of the Philippines
Treaties of Spain
Treaties of Sweden
1982 in labor relations